Imbricariopsis carbonacea, common name carbon imbricaria, is a species of sea snail, a marine gastropod mollusk in the family Mitridae, the miters or miter snails.

Description
The length of the shell varies between 17 mm and 32 mm.

Distribution
This marine species occurs off West Africa (Mauritania, Cape Verde Islands) and Angola to South Africa.

References

External links
 Gastropods.com: Imbricariopsis carbonacea
 Hinds R.B. (1844-1845). Mollusca. In: The zoology of the voyage of H. M. S. "Sulphur", under the command of Captain Sir Edward Belcher, R. N., C. B., F. R. G. S., etc., during the years 1836-42. London: Smith, Elder and Co. v + 72 pp., 21 pls.
 Fedosov A., Puillandre N., Herrmann M., Kantor Yu., Oliverio M., Dgebuadze P., Modica M.V. & Bouchet P. (2018). The collapse of Mitra: molecular systematics and morphology of the Mitridae (Gastropoda: Neogastropoda). Zoological Journal of the Linnean Society. 183(2): 253-337

Mitridae
Gastropods described in 1844
Molluscs of the Atlantic Ocean
Molluscs of Angola
Gastropods of Cape Verde
Invertebrates of South Africa